Fly Mountain is a mountain located in the Catskill Mountains of New York south of Kingston. Golden Hill is located north-northeast, Hussey Hill is located east, and Pink Hill is located northwest of Fly Mountain.

References

Mountains of Ulster County, New York
Mountains of New York (state)